Dichodontium is a genus of mosses belonging to the family Dicranaceae.

The genus was first described by Wilhelm Philippe Schimper.

The genus has cosmopolitan distribution.

Species:
 Dichodontium pellucidum Schimp., 1856

References

Dicranales
Moss genera